Sandy Reid (born 1958) is the Scottish author of the book Never To Return.

Nominated for the Orwell Prize in 2008 the book is written from the viewpoint of a Scottish Traveller, and portrays a harrowing journey through childhood, characterised by adversity and abuse. The book describes how Sandy entered care at a young age and how this experience isolated him from his family, his heritage, his identity and his transient way of life.

Bibliography
Never To Return (Black and White Publishing 2008 ) (Mehta publishing India 2011 )

References

1958 births
Living people
Scottish writers
Child sexual abuse in literature
Scottish Travellers